The 1939–40 Divizia A was the twenty-eighth season of Divizia A, the top-level football league of Romania.

Teams

League table

Results

Top goalscorers

Champion squad

See also 

 1939–40 Divizia B

References

Liga I seasons
Romania
1939–40 in Romanian football